The 1967–68 Israel State Cup (Gvia HaMedina) was the 29th season of Israel's nationwide football cup competition and the 14th after the Israeli Declaration of Independence.

The competition started on 9 September 1967 with a preliminary round, played by 20 Liga Gimel clubs Liga Alef clubs joined the competition in the third round, played on 25 November 1967 and Liga Leumit entered in the fifth round, on 27 April 1968.

Hapoel Petah Tikva and Bnei Yehuda met in the final, played on  12 June 1968, the later winning by a single goal to claim its first cup.

Results

Preliminary round
20 Liga Gimel teams were drawn in this round. Matches were played on 9 September 1967.

First round
Matches were played on 30 September 1967. 128 teams were drawn to play in this round (including the ties from the previous round). However, since several of the teams drawn quit before the round was played, only 28 matches took place.

Also qualified from this round: 
Maccabi Afula, Beitar al-Amal Nazareth, Hapoel Yardena, Hapoel Tirat HaCarmel, Hapoel Tel Mond, Hapoel Zikhron Ya'akov, Hapoel Afula, Hapoel Beit Eliezer, Hapoel Hod HaSharon, Hapoel Shefayim, Beitar Kiryat Shmona, M.S. Even Yehuda, Hapoel Ahva Haifa, Hapoel HaTzafon Tel Aviv, Hapoel Ganei Tikva, Hapoel Rehovot, Hapoel Qalansawe, Beitar Ganei Tikva, Maccabi Yavne, Hapoel Sde Uziyah, Maccabi HaSharon Netanya, Hapoel Beit Shemesh, Beitar Jaffa, Beitar Beit Shemesh, Maccabi Ramat HaShikma, Maccabi Rehovot, Hapoel Ofakim, Hapoel Ramat HaSharon, Hapoel Mitzpe Ramon, Beitar Holon, Shimshon Ashkelon.

Second round
Matches were played on 28 October 1967. As in the previous round, resignations and forfeits meant that only 20 of the 32 scheduled matches were played.

Also qualified from this round: 
Hapoel Bat Yam, Hapoel Kiryat Shmona, Hapoel Beit Shemesh, Hapoel Ramla, Hapoel HaTzafon Tel Aviv, Hapoel Yardena, Hapoel Ya'akov Kfar Saba, Maccabi Neve Sha'anan, Hapoel Sde Nahum, Beitar Dov Netanya, Hapoel Qalansawe, Shimshon Nahariya

Third round
Liga Alef clubs entered the competition on this round. As in previous seasons, The draw was set so that Liga Alef clubs wouldn't be drawn against each other.
Matches were played on 25 November 1967, with several matches postponed due to weather conditions. These matches were played on 5 December 1967.

Fourth round
Matches were held on 30 December 1967, with postponed and abandoned matches (due to weather conditions being played on 23 March 1968. The match between Hapoel Safed and Hapoel Kiryat Ono was delayed even further, and was finally played on 2 April 1968.

Fifth round
Liga Leumit clubs entered the competition in this round. The IFA arranged the draw so each Liga Leumit clubs wouldn't be drawn to play each other.

Sixth round

Quarter-finals

Semi-finals

Final

Notes

References
100 Years of Football 1906-2006, Elisha Shohat (Israel), 2006

External links
 Israel Football Association website

Israel State Cup
State Cup
Israel State Cup seasons